Bumbwini is a village on the Tanzanian island of Unguja, part of Zanzibar. It is located in the northwest of the island, on a short peninsula immediately to the south of Tumbatu Island.

References
Finke, J. (2006) The Rough Guide to Zanzibar (2nd edition). New York: Rough Guides.

Villages in Zanzibar